Sara Santostasi (born 24 January 1993) is an Italian actress, singer and dancer. She was one of the contestants in seventh series of Ballando con le Stelle, the Italian version of Dancing with the Stars.

Filmography

Films

Television

Stage

References

External links 

1993 births
Living people
People from Anzio
Italian film actresses